Stefano Lippi (born 23 January 1981) is a paralympic athlete from Italy competing mainly in category T42 sprint and long jump events.

Biography
Stefano has competed at two Paralympics.  His first was in 2004  where he competed in the 100m, 200m and 4 × 100 m relay and won a silver medal in the F42 long jump.  His second games were in 2008  where he competed in the log jump and 100m but was unable to win a second medal.

References

External links
 

1981 births
Living people
Paralympic athletes of Italy
Paralympic silver medalists for Italy
Athletes (track and field) at the 2004 Summer Paralympics
Athletes (track and field) at the 2008 Summer Paralympics
Medalists at the 2004 Summer Paralympics
Paralympic medalists in athletics (track and field)
Italian male sprinters
Italian male long jumpers